Agabus bipustulatus is a species of beetle native to the Palearctic (including Europe), the Afro-tropical region, the Near East and North Africa. In Europe, it is found everywhere except in several small countries and islands: the Canary Islands, Franz Josef Land, Gibraltar, Madeira, Malta, Moldova, Monaco, the North Aegean Islands, Novaya Zemlya, San Marino, the Selvagens Islands, Svalbard and Jan Mayen, and Vatican City.

External links

Agabus bipustulatus at Fauna Europaea

bipustulatus
Beetles described in 1767
Beetles of Europe
Beetles of Africa
Taxa named by Carl Linnaeus